Joseph P. Condo (February 19, 1848 – August 19, 1923) was an American politician.

Condo was born in Centre County, Pennsylvania. He moved to Moccasin, Illinois in 1868. Condo served in the Effingham County Board and was a Republican Party. Condo served in the Illinois House of Representatives from 1887 to 1889 and from 1895 to 1897. Condo died in Pana, Illinois.

Notes

External links

1848 births
1923 deaths
People from Centre County, Pennsylvania
People from Effingham County, Illinois
County board members in Illinois
Republican Party members of the Illinois House of Representatives